Louis Marin may refer to:

 Louis Marin (philosopher) (1931–92), French philosopher
 Louis Marin (politician)  (1871–1960), French politician
 Louis Stanislas Marin-Lavigne (1797–1860), French painter and lithographer.